{{DISPLAYTITLE:C7H10O7}}
The molecular formula C7H10O7 (molar mass: 206.15 g/mol, exact mass: 206.0427 u) may refer to:

 Homocitric acid
 Homoisocitric acid

Molecular formulas